"In Your Head" is a song by Swedish-Congolese singer-songwriter Mohombi. It was released on December 3, 2011 as a digital download in Sweden and it was released worldwide in January 2012. The song's chorus interpolates The Cranberries' "Zombie", as written by Dolores O'Riordan. "In Your Head" was written by Lucas Secon, Quiz & Larossi and Mohombi, and it was produced by Quiz & Larossi & Lucas Secon. The track's video is listed in the library of showcased singles of National Geographic Music India.

Music video
A music video to accompany the release of "In Your Head" was first released onto YouTube on December 2, 2011 and has received over 31 Million views at a total length of three minutes and seventeen seconds. The video was shot in New York City. It is licensed by UMG (on behalf of Universal-Island Records Ltd.).

Track listing

Charts

Weekly charts

Year-end charts

Release history

References

2011 singles
Mohombi songs
Songs written by Dolores O'Riordan
Songs written by Lucas Secon
2101 Records singles
2011 songs
Song recordings produced by Quiz & Larossi
Songs written by Andreas Romdhane
Songs written by Josef Larossi
Songs written by Mohombi